The Potato Marketing Corporation of Western Australia (PMC) was a statutory corporation created by the Government of Western Australia's Marketing of Potatoes Act 1946. It was charged with managing the supply of fresh table potatoes in Western Australia. The statutory corporation operated to ensure licensed growers supplied potatoes all year round to the WA consumer market. The corporation was self-funded by revenue from licence fees and did not receive financial support from the state government. The agency dictated the varieties and volume in the WA potato market.

History 
The statutory marketing body was created in 1946. The PMC has 78 licensed growers in its books as of 2014. They output 50 000 tonnes of potatoes to the market. In 2004, there were 151 growers. Further consolidation of growers is expected as the market changes due to technology and market pressures. 

The PMC is remembered for a high-profile dispute with potato grower and retailer Tony Galati. In 1998, the PMC refused to accept trucks of potatoes from Tony Galati for not arriving on time. Tony proceeded to give the potatoes away for free whilst calling for the regulatory agency to be scrapped and allow free competition. The campaign succeeded in 2015 when the state government confirmed it would abolish the agency within two years. 

The President of the Potato Growers Association of WA, Dean Ryan was opposed to scrapping the agency and claimed it would put growers out of business. This came from the Harper Competition Policy Review and also the Economic Regulation Authority of WA which points to this as a case study of regulation restricting competition. The Potato Growers Association of WA launched a new website to counter criticism from those in favour of scrapping the board.

Abolition
The passage of the Marketing of Potatoes Amendment and Repeal Act 2016 in September amended the Marketing of Potatoes Act 1946 to abolish the PMC on 31 December 2016 and to provide transitional provisions as to its winding up.

Former Marketing boards and the date of disestablishment.

Varieties 
The PMC has approved the following varieties of potatoes that growers can grow.
 Carlington
 Delaware
 Desiree
 Eureka
 Kestrel
 Kipfler
 Mondial
 Nadine
 Royal Blue
 Ruby Lou
 White Star

See also 
 Potato Council
 Single desk

References

External links 
 Potato Growers Association of WA
 WA Potatoes

Statutory agencies of Western Australia
Potato organizations
Agricultural marketing organizations
1946 establishments in Australia
2016 disestablishments in Australia
Agricultural organisations based in Australia
Marketing in Australia